Elections to the Caithness District Council took place on 7 May 1992, alongside elections to the councils of Scotland's various other districts. Independents remained in control of the council, winning 14 of the 16 seats. Nine candidates were elected unopposed, including one each from Labour and the Liberal Party. Voter turnout in the contested wards was 57.8%.

Aggregate results

Ward results 
}

References

1992 Scottish local elections